Kabozha is the name of several rural localities in Russia:
Kabozha, Khvoyninsky District, Novgorod Oblast, a railway station in Kabozhskoye Settlement of Khvoyninsky District of Novgorod Oblast
Kabozha, Moshenskoy District, Novgorod Oblast, a village in Kalininskoye Settlement of Moshenskoy District of Novgorod Oblast
Kabozha, Vologda Oblast, a village in Belokrestsky Selsoviet of Chagodoshchensky District of Vologda Oblast